Eupithecia dubiosa is a moth in the family Geometridae. It is found on Cyprus and in the Levant.

The wingspan is about 17–19 mm.

References

Moths described in 1910
dubiosa
Moths of Europe
Moths of Asia